In number theory, Zolotarev's lemma states that the Legendre symbol

for an integer a modulo an odd prime number p, where p does not divide a, can be computed as the sign of a permutation:

where ε denotes the signature of a permutation and πa is the permutation of the nonzero residue classes mod p induced by multiplication by a.

For example, take a = 2 and p = 7. The nonzero squares mod 7 are 1, 2, and 4, so (2|7) = 1 and (6|7) = −1. Multiplication by 2 on the nonzero numbers mod 7 has the cycle decomposition (1,2,4)(3,6,5), so the sign of this permutation is 1, which is (2|7). Multiplication by 6 on the nonzero numbers mod 7 has cycle decomposition (1,6)(2,5)(3,4), whose sign is −1, which is (6|7).

Proof
In general, for any finite group G of order n, it is straightforward to determine the signature of the permutation πg made by left-multiplication by the element g of G. The permutation πg will be even, unless there are an odd number of orbits of even size. Assuming n even, therefore, the condition for πg to be an odd permutation, when g has order k, is that n/k should be odd, or that the subgroup <g> generated by g should have odd index.

We will apply this to the group of nonzero numbers mod p, which is a cyclic group of order p − 1. The jth power of a primitive root modulo p will have index the greatest common divisor

i = (j, p − 1).

The condition for a nonzero number mod p to be a quadratic non-residue is to be an odd power of a primitive root.
The lemma therefore comes down to saying that i is odd when j is odd, which is true a fortiori, and j is odd when i is odd, which is true because p − 1 is even (p is odd).

Another proof
Zolotarev's lemma can be deduced easily from Gauss's lemma and vice versa. The example
,
i.e. the Legendre symbol (a/p) with a = 3 and p = 11, will illustrate how the proof goes. Start with the set {1, 2, . . . , p − 1} arranged as a matrix of two rows such that the sum of the two elements in any column is zero mod p, say:

Apply the permutation :

The columns still have the property that the sum of two elements in one column is zero mod p. Now apply a permutation V which swaps any pairs in which the upper member was originally a lower member:

Finally, apply a permutation W which gets back the original matrix:

We have W−1 = VU. Zolotarev's lemma says (a/p) = 1 if and only if the permutation U is even. Gauss's lemma says (a/p) = 1 iff V is even. But W is even, so the two lemmas are equivalent for the given (but arbitrary) a and p.

Jacobi symbol

This interpretation of the Legendre symbol as the sign of a permutation can be extended to the Jacobi symbol

where a and n are relatively prime integers with odd n > 0: a is invertible mod n, so multiplication by a on Z/nZ is a permutation and a generalization of Zolotarev's lemma is that the Jacobi symbol above is the sign of this permutation.

For example, multiplication by 2 on Z/21Z has cycle decomposition (0)(1,2,4,8,16,11)(3,6,12)(5,10,20,19,17,13)(7,14)(9,18,15), so the sign of this permutation is (1)(−1)(1)(−1)(−1)(1) = −1 and the Jacobi symbol (2|21) is −1.  (Note that multiplication by 2 on the units mod 21 is a product of two 6-cycles, so its sign is 1. Thus it's important to use all integers mod n and not just the units mod n to define the right permutation.)

When n = p is an odd prime and a is not divisible by p, multiplication by a fixes 0 mod p, so the sign of multiplication by a on all numbers mod p and on the units mod p have the same sign. But for composite n that is not the case, as we see in the example above.

History
This lemma was introduced by Yegor Ivanovich Zolotarev in an 1872 proof of quadratic reciprocity.

References

External links
PlanetMath article on Zolotarev's lemma; includes his proof of quadratic reciprocity

Articles containing proofs
Lemmas in number theory
Permutations
Quadratic residue
Squares in number theory